Dennis Baker may refer to:
 Dennis Baker (cricketer) (born 1947), Australian cricketer
 Dennis Baker (politician) (1927–2014), American lawyer and politician in Mississippi
 Dennis Baker (rugby league), English rugby league player